Dax Pierson (born 1970) is an American musician from Oakland, California. He has been a member of Subtle and 13 & God.

Life and career
Dax Pierson worked at Amoeba Music in Berkeley, California for 10 years. He has been a member of Subtle and 13 & God.

In 2005, he was seriously injured and left paralyzed from the chest down when the Subtle tour van hit a patch of black ice in Iowa. His musician friends and promoters subsequently organized a series of tribute shows and benefit albums. In 2009, he sued Ford Motor Company for faulty design mechanics, arguing that the defective seat contributed to his life-threatening injuries. A federal court jury awarded him $18.3 million ($12.3 million for medical expenses and lost earnings and $6 million for pain and suffering).

He released Live in Oakland on Ratskin Records in 2019.

Discography

Studio albums
 Intro To (2002)
 Pablo Feldman Sun Riley (2006) 
 Nerve Bumps (2021)

Live albums
 Live in Oakland (2019)

Contributions
 Anticon - "Pitty Party People" from We Ain't Fessin' (Double Quotes) (2002)
 Jel - "14. Dynamic Button" from 10 Seconds (2002)
 Themselves - "Good People Check" and "Hat in the Wind" from The No Music (2002)
 Odd Nosdam - "Untitled" from No More Wig for Ohio (2003)
 Alias - "Unseen Sights" from Muted (2003)
 Odd Nosdam - "Untitled Two" from Burner (2005)
 Alias & Tarsier - "Picking the Same Lock" from Brookland/Oaklyn (2006)
 Odd Nosdam - "Hollow Me" from Pretty Swell Explode (2008)
 Themselves - "You Ain't It" from Crowns Down (2009)
 Alias - "Talk in Technicolor" from Fever Dream (2011)

References

External links
 

Living people
1970 births
American multi-instrumentalists
Musicians from Oakland, California